The Wasilla Community Hall, also known as the Wasilla Museum, now hosting the Dorothy G. Page Museum, is located at 323 Main Street in Wasilla, Alaska.  The museum is located in a log building constructed in 1931 to serve as a community center.  The exterior of the building was left largely as-is when it was converted to a museum in 1967.  The interior houses displays about the history of the city of Wasilla.

The building was listed on the National Register of Historic Places in 1982.

See also
 National Register of Historic Places listings in Matanuska-Susitna Borough, Alaska

References

External links
 City of Wasilla Museum web site

Buildings and structures completed in 1930
Community centers in the United States
Event venues on the National Register of Historic Places in Alaska
History museums in Alaska
Museums in Matanuska-Susitna Borough, Alaska
Buildings and structures on the National Register of Historic Places in Matanuska-Susitna Borough, Alaska
Wasilla, Alaska
Log buildings and structures on the National Register of Historic Places in Alaska